Dominique Darel (1950–1978) was a French model and actress, mainly active in Italian cinema.

Darel was born in Cannes and moved to Rome in the late 1960s.  She made her film debut in Luchino Visconti's Death in Venice, then became a minor starlet in Italian genre cinema. She is probably best known for the role of Maria Romana De Gasperi in Roberto Rossellini's Year One.

She died at 28, on June 4, 1978, in a car accident in Cannes.

References

External links 
 

French film actresses
1978 deaths
Road incident deaths in France
1950 births
People from Cannes
French female models
20th-century French actresses